Sulug Island is an island located in the West Coast of Sabah, Malaysia. The island is part of the Tunku Abdul Rahman National Park.

See also
 List of islands of Malaysia

References

External links 
 Slovenský miliardár stavil na luxus. V Malajzii 

Islands of Sabah